Above Derwent is a civil parish in the Borough of Allerdale in Cumbria, England.  It contains 16 listed buildings that are recorded in the National Heritage List for England.  All the listed buildings are designated at Grade II, the lowest of the three grades, which is applied to "buildings of national importance and special interest".  The parish is in the Lake District National Park, and it includes the settlements of Braithwaite, Thornthwaite, Portinscale, Stair and Little Town.  Parts of the parish are agricultural, and much of it consists of fells and mountains. All the listed buildings are in the settlements and the valleys.  Most of them are, or originated as, houses, farmhouses, and farm buildings.  The other listed buildings include churches, war memorial and a bridge.


Buildings

References

Citations

Sources

Lists of listed buildings in Cumbria